A court order is an official proclamation by a judge (or panel of judges) that defines the legal relationships between the parties to a hearing, a trial, an appeal or other court proceedings. Such ruling requires or authorizes the carrying out of certain steps by one or more parties to a case. A court order must be signed by a judge; some jurisdictions may also require it to be notarized.

Content
The content and provisions of a court order depend on the type of proceeding, the phase of the proceedings in which they are issued, and the procedural and evidentiary rules that govern the proceedings.

An order can be as simple as setting a date for trial or as complex as restructuring contractual relationships by and between many corporations in a multi-jurisdictional dispute.  It may be a final order (one that concludes the court action), or an interim order (one during the action).  Most orders are written, and are signed by the judge. Some orders, however, are spoken orally by the judge in open court, and are only reduced to writing in the transcript of the proceedings.

Examples 
The following represents a small sampling of matters that are commonly dictated by the terms of a court order:
Restraining order  
Temporary protective order  
Emergency protective order 
Search warrant  
Divorce decree 
Child custody  
Child support 
Lawsuit rulings 
Criminal sentences 
Court dates 
Equitable remedy  
Stay of execution

U.S. interim order
One kind of interim court order is a temporary restraining order (TRO), to preserve the status quo.  Such an order may later be overturned or vacated during the litigation; or it may become a final order and judgment, subject then to appeal.

In the area of domestic violence, U.S. courts will routinely issue a temporary order of protection (TOP) (or temporary protective order, TPO)  to prevent any further violence or threat of violence.

In family law, temporary orders can also be called pendente lite relief and may include grants of temporary alimony, child custody, and/or visitation.

See also 
 Anti-social behaviour order 
 Drinking Banning Order 
 Injunction
 Gag order
 Lawburrows 
 Lawsuit
 Judge
 Hearing (law)
 Trial

Notes

References

Court orders